The National Ballet of China Symphony Orchestra is a national symphony orchestra of China.

The orchestra was founded in 1959 under the National Ballet of China. Zhang Yi is the music director and chief conductor and Liu Ju is the resident conductor.

French conductor Jean Perrison has visited the orchestra and offered technical exchanges during his stay in China. Ashley Lawrence, the chief conductor of National Symphony Orchestra of Peru; Peter Larsen, the chief conductor of Royal Danish Ballet and a group of soloists and singers from the American Music Education Delegation have held various concerts with the orchestra.

In recent years, the orchestra has been regularly invited to audio and video recording by various Central stations, China Central Television and other China's record companies, publishers and film studios. It has toured across China including Hong Kong and Macao, as well as overseas. The orchestra has performed many works in the ballet repertoire: Swan Lake, The Sleeping Beauty, The Nutcracker, Raise the Red Lantern, Pirates, Don Quixote, Coppélia, Leiquan, Ji Purcell and others.

Useful links

National Ballet of China Symphony Orchestra Webpage
  National Ballet of China Symphony Orchestra - Orchestra Members' List Webpage
Nation Ballet of China Official Website
List of Symphony Orchestras in Greater China -PRC. HKSAR. Macao SAR and Taiwan

China orchestras
Musical groups established in 1959
1959 establishments in China